Gábor Schaller (born 7 January 1966) is a Hungarian equestrian. He competed in the team eventing at the 1996 Summer Olympics.

References

External links
 

1966 births
Living people
Hungarian male equestrians
Olympic equestrians of Hungary
Equestrians at the 1996 Summer Olympics
Sportspeople from Budapest